The erotic thriller is a film subgenre defined as a film that "combines romanticized, 'erotic' appeal with a dangerous 'thriller' narrative—a "pleasure/danger" principle". The elements of bodily danger and pleasure are central to the plot. Most erotic thrillers contain scenes of softcore sex, though the frequency and explicitness of those scenes varies. British academic Linda Ruth Williams described erotic thriller films as "noirish stories of sexual intrigue incorporating some form of criminality or duplicity, often as the flimsy framework for onscreen softcore sex".

The word "erotic" began to adhere to "thriller" during the 1980s to describe a sudden boom in noir-like thriller films with sexually provocative content. The late 1980s to the mid-1990s are regarded as the "classic period" of the erotic thriller, and the most recognizable films of the genre, such as Basic Instinct, Fatal Attraction, and The Last Seduction were released in this era.

Precursors to the erotic thriller
In his book Hollywood's Dark Cinema: The American Film Noir, Robert Barton Palmer claimed "perhaps the most popular genre in the 1990s, the so-called erotic thriller [...] is a direct descendant of the classic film noir". Many films of the 1960s and 70s also provocatively mixed noir themes with softcore sex, erotic fantasy, and voyeurism. The erotic thriller also contains influences from the genres of mystery and horror, as well as from pornography.

Notable figures 
Certain filmmakers and actors are associated with the genre. Brian De Palma helped usher in the classic period of the genre with films Dressed to Kill and Body Double, and directed Femme Fatale and Passion later in his career. Dutch filmmaker Paul Verhoeven directed Basic Instinct, Showgirls, and Benedetta. Joe Eszterhas became a sought-after screenwriter in the classic period, writing the screenplays for Jagged Edge, Basic Instinct, Showgirls, and Jade. Adrian Lyne has directed several films of the genre, including 9½ Weeks, Fatal Attraction, Indecent Proposal, Unfaithful, and Deep Water. Other filmmakers include Atom Egoyan, Paul Schrader, Abel Ferrara, William Friedkin, David Cronenberg, and Zalman King.

The most recognizable actor associated with erotic thrillers is Michael Douglas, who starred in four films—Fatal Attraction, Basic Instinct, Disclosure, and A Perfect Murder. Mickey Rourke, Richard Gere, James Spader, and Tom Berenger have also starred in multiple films of the genre. Notable actresses include Sharon Stone, Linda Fiorentino, Glenn Close, Kathleen Turner, Demi Moore, and Greta Scaachi.

List of films: 1930–1940

1931
 Safe in Hell

List of films: 1940–1970

1944
 Double Indemnity

1958
 Vertigo

1962
 Lolita

1966
 Trans-Europ-Express

1969
 Blind Beast
 Venus in Furs (a.k.a. Black Angel and Paroxismus)

List of films: 1970–1980

1971
 She Killed in Ecstasy

1972
 Last Tango in Paris
 Punarjanmam
 The Stepmother

1973
 Maru Piravi

1974
 The Teacher
 Wife to Be Sacrificed

1975
 Waves of Lust

1976
 The Hook (a.k.a. To Agistri)
 Obsession
 Vortex (a.k.a. Blondie, Blondy, and Germacide)

1977
 Looking for Mr. Goodbar

1978
 Attacked!! (a.k.a. Attack!!)
 The Eyes of Laura Mars
 Nicole (a.k.a. Crazed and The Widow's Revenge)

List of films: 1980–1990

1980

1981

1982
 Cat People (erotic-horror)
 The Seduction

1983
 American Nightmare
 Female Cats
 The Fourth Man
 The Hunger (erotic-horror)

1984

1985

1986

1987

1988

1989

List of films: 1990–1996

1990

1991

1992

1993

1994

1995

1996

List of films: 1997–2007

1997

1998

1999

2000

2001

2002

2003

2004

2005

2006
 Aksar
 Basic Instinct 2, neo-noir
 Ganda Hendathi

2007
 Boarding Gate
I Know Who Killed Me, psychological erotic-thriller
 Socket

List of films: 2008–present

2008
 Death in Love
Deception
 The Kreutzer Sonata
 Loft
 Poison Ivy: The Secret Society
 Sex and Lies in Sin City

2009

2010
 The Housemaid
 Red Nights, erotic-horror
 Secret Love
 Vlees
 Wild Things: Foursome

2011
 Murder 2
 Ragini MMS
 Silver Tongues
 X: Night of Vengeance

2012
 Dangerous Liaisons
 Hate Story
 In the House
 Jism 2
 Passion
 The Taste of Money
 Under My Nails

2013

2014

2015

2016

2017
 Aksar 2
 L'Amant double (a.k.a. Double Lover)
 Unforgettable

2018
In Darkness
 Hate Story 4

2020
 365 Days
 Fatale
 Lost Girls & Love Hotels
 What Lies Below

2021
 Benedetta, religious erotic-thriller
 The Beta Test, dark comedy erotic-thriller
 Deadly Illusions
The Voyeurs

2022
 Deep Water
 Don't Worry Darling
 365 Days: This Day

Miscellaneous crossover films
 Macabre, 1980, erotic-horror
 The Fan, 1981, erotic-horror
 Lovely But Deadly, 1981, erotic-action
 Ms. 45, 1981, erotic exploitation
 The Postman Always Rings Twice, 1981, erotic-drama
 Naked Killer, 1992, Hong Kong erotic-action 
 Shadows Run Black, 1984, erotic-crime thriller
 Sole Survivor, 1984, erotic-horror
 Sea of Love, 1989, neo-noir
 Kill Me Again, 1989, erotic neo-noir
 Inner Sanctum, 1991, erotic-drama
 Basic Instinct, 1992, neo-noir 
 Romeo Is Bleeding, 1993, erotic neo-noir
 Inner Sanctum II, 1994, erotic-drama 
 China Moon, 1994, erotic neo-noir
 The Last Seduction, 1994, erotic neo-noir
 Bound, 1996, erotic neo-noir crime thriller
 The Last Seduction II, 1999, erotic neo-noir

Post-period crossover films
 Femme Fatale, 2002 mystery/thriller neo-noir
 Unfaithful 2002, erotic-drama
 Basic Instinct 2, 2006, neo-noir
 Lust, Caution, 2007, erotic-drama
 Chloe 2009 lesbian romantic drama
 Compulsion, 2013, psychological dark comedy erotic thriller
 Frank & Lola, 2016, erotic neo-noir
 The Handmaiden 2016 lesbian romantic drama

References

Bibliography

Erotic thriller